Cyprien Hakiza is a major general in the Army of Burundi.

From September 2009, he has been the deputy commander of AMISOM replacing the late Major General Juvenal Niyoyunguruza.  He rotated out of AMISOM in September 2011.

References

Year of birth missing (living people)
Military of Burundi
Living people